Bowman Gray Stadium is a NASCAR sanctioned  asphalt flat oval short track and longstanding football stadium located in Winston-Salem, North Carolina. It is one of stock car racing's most legendary venues, and is referred to as "NASCAR's longest-running weekly race track". Bowman Gray Stadium is part of the Winston-Salem Sports and Entertainment Complex and is home of the Winston-Salem State University Rams football team. It was also the home of the Wake Forest University football team from 1956 until Groves Stadium (now Truist Field at Wake Forest) opened in 1968.  Bowman Gray Stadium was a popular venue for high school football in the 1970s and 1980s.  Parkland and R.J. Reynolds High Schools shared Bowman Gray Stadium as their home field for high school football until the two schools built their own facility (Deaton-Thompson Stadium) in 1994.

History
The stadium was built in 1937 as a public works project to provide jobs during the Great Depression. The first event at the new stadium was a football game in the fall of 1938 between Wake Forest College and Duke University. In the beginning, the stadium's sole use was for collegiate football until trotter horse racing was added on the 0.250-mile dirt oval. The first auto racing at Bowman Gray was a type of midget car racing  on the dirt quarter mile track from 1939 through 1949. The track was paved in 1947, after a promoter got the City of Winston-Salem to agree to pay to have the track paved in exchange for restitution of payments through a percentage of future income from races. However, after the track was paved the promoter fled before any payments were made to the city. Stock car racing at Bowman Gray Stadium was started by Bill France Sr. and Alvin Hawkins, two men who were founding fathers of NASCAR. The track was NASCAR's very first weekly track and the very first paved track that NASCAR raced on. The track would run weekly NASCAR sanctioned events during the summer months.

The first NASCAR-sanctioned event took place on May 18, 1949, and was won by Fonty Flock. The track was opened by NASCAR founder Bill France Sr. and Alvin Hawkins, and remains operated by members of the Hawkins family to this day. By the end of the inaugural Bowman Gray season 11 races had been run and five more were rained out. Tim Flock won the track championship with a season that included four wins.

As the racing had become extremely popular at the track, an additional 7,000 seats were added in 1953, raising the seating capacity from 10,000 to 17,000.

The track has hosted numerous series throughout the years including the NASCAR Grand National Series (now NASCAR Cup Series), NASCAR Convertible Division, NASCAR Late Model Short Track Division (now NASCAR Xfinity Series), NASCAR Grand American, Dash Series, NASCAR Whelen Southern Modified Tour, NASCAR Late Model Sportsman Division, and NASCAR K&N Pro Series. The first Grand National event took place in 1958 and it was won by Bob Welborn. Other winners include Glen Wood, Rex White, David Pearson, Richard Petty, Bobby Allison, Junior Johnson and Marvin Panch. Richard Petty won his 100th race at the track. The Grand National Series first raced at the track in 1958 and hosted a total of 29 Grand National races through 1971.

Motorcycle races were run on a temporary dirt track at the stadium in 1970 and 1971. The stock car races were run first in the events before construction crews would lay dirt down during an intermission for motorcycles races the same night.

Bowman Gray's nickname, the "Madhouse," is largely attributed to the racing antics that take place on the tight, quarter mile bull ring. In 2014, Bowman Gray's promoter, Gray Garrison described the events at BGS as part racing, part religion, and part wrestling. While this is partially the reason for the nickname, it actually originated from a qualifying format the track used in the 1950s called the "mad scramble."

In 2015, Bowman Gray celebrated its 1,000th NASCAR sanctioned race 

On November 14, 2018, it was announced that the Stadium would get a $9 million renovation. It will begin in 2019, with construction starting in 2020 and ending in 2022. It will include new restrooms, a track resurface, and a new name for the football field titled "Rams Field At Bowman Gray".
Currently, the track features four divisions: the modifieds, sportsman, street stock and stadium stock. The modifieds are the featured division at Bowman Gray, the division started in 1949 and the all-time wins list features some of the best NASCAR drivers including Lee Petty, Ralph Earnhardt, Ned Jarrett, Richie Evans, and Jerry Cook.

The football history of the stadium is also quite storied. Wake Forest University played home games in the stadium from its move to Winston-Salem in 1956, until the 1968 season when Groves Stadium (now Truist Field at Wake Forest) opened. Players such as Brian Piccolo, the 1964 ACC Player of the Year who led the nation in rushing and scoring, played their home games in Bowman Gray. Piccolo  later became famous as the teammate of Gale Sayers with the Chicago Bears, and the subject of the 1971 film Brian's Song. The Winston-Salem high schools of R.J. Reynolds High and Parkland High also played their home games at the stadium in the late 1960s through the 1980s.

Today

Bowman Gray's weekly racing tradition continues as part of the Whelen All-American Series, with races Saturday evenings from the end of April through August. The track can seat 17,000 people in the stands, with an additional 2,000 standing-room around the wall above the seating areas. The weekly races during the year normally have an average attendance between 12,000 and 15,000 per night. Many events are standing room only, as some events have had estimated crowds of more than 23,000 show up.

Weekly races include the modified, sportsman, street stock and stadium stock divisions. Bowman Gray is also a part of the special events including classic modified coupes and East Coast Flathead Ford Racing Association (ECFFRA), monster trucks, demolition derbies, chain races, skid races and INEX Legends Car and bandolero races. The History Channel show MadHouse was taped at the track during the 2009 season. The showed aired in January 2010 and ran through April 2010. On October 29, 2018, a new show titled "Race Night At Bowman Gray" aired on Discovery Channel. The show focused on the Modified Division. After the first few episodes, the show was moved to the Discovery Go App, after fear of cancellation. The show would later go on to eventually be canceled.

Spectators listen to the officials during the races on frequencies 461.200 MHz, 463.625 MHz, and 466.600 MHz on a scanner or "race radio." Many, if not all of the drivers also communicate via a two-way radio during the race. Most of them use a frequency between 450 and 470 MHz, but there are exceptions.

On October 11, 2021, NASCAR announced that they will be running a tire test at Bowman Gray for the Next Gen (NASCAR) car, in preparation for the 2022 Busch Clash, now in the L.A. Coliseum with a track layout similar to the Madhouse. This was the first time in over 50 years that NASCAR Cup Series cars ran on the legendary track.

For the 2022 racing season, along with the other previously announced renovations, new concession stands and drains in the apron of the turns were added to help remove water in the event of rain.

Past NASCAR Cup Series winners

In 1971, the Grand National Series allowed drivers to choose a smaller car from the Grand American division, which ran smaller pony cars, like the Ford Mustang which Bobby Allison chose for the race, alongside cars like the Chevrolet Camaro and AMC Javelin. Allison's usual car was the Ford Galaxie, but for this race at the shortest paved track on the schedule, he chose a shorter-wheelbase car with a much smaller engine, 302cui, 5.0ltr. V8 versus the Galaxie's 427cui, 7ltr V8. The shorter wheelbase allowed much better handling on slow, narrow short tracks like Bowman-Gray, but gave Allison an advantage that was seen as unfair by his competitors, such as second-place runner Richard Petty, whom filed an official complaint with NASCAR officials at the close of the race. NASCAR officials agreed, and stripped Allison of his win and prize money. However, instead of declaring Petty the winner, NASCAR left the race without an official winner. To this day, Allison reports his win count as 85, despite his official win total being 84.  In motorsport series with different classes of cars in the same event, there are different class winners per race (a procedure similar to what NASCAR used for later combination races).  In this case, Allison, in a Grand American car, would be classified as the overall race winner and Grand American class winner, and Petty, in a Grand National car, would be classified as the Grand National class winner.  Petty would have 201 wins under this classification.

Multiple Winners (Drivers)

Multiple Winners (Owners)

Manufacturer Wins

Past NASCAR Convertible Series Winners

NOTES:
 Apr 22, 1957: Race shortened from 150 laps to 140 due to rain.

Track Champions
2020 season was canceled due to COVID

Modified and Sportsman car counts were thin during the latter part of the 1950s and the track combined the two and let the V6s run with the V8s and named it the "Modified-Sportsman Division".  Leading into the 1968 season, the track dropped the Sportsman cars and title, hence officially named the featured division as the Modifieds.

The Amateur Division was the support division to the Modified-Sportsman and ran from 1950 to mid-1958, where the division dissolved and the track picked up the Hobby Division.

The Claiming Division was tabbed as a third weekly division in 1964. It was a division that cost only $99 to run, it was so popular that the track had to cut the fields down to two races with ten cars apiece. The division ran from 1964 to 1972. The track changed the name to what is now the Sportsman Division.

The Hobby Division, which was the predecessor of the Street Stock Division, ran from mid-1958 to 1974. Then the following year, the division was renamed to the Street Stocks.

Bowman Gray ran Blunderbust races as a fourth division from 1977-1989 until they replaced that division with the Buzzbomber Division in 1990. The following season, the track kept the cars, but changed the division to what is now the Stadium Stock Division.

Gallery

See also
Whelen All-American Series
Whelen Southern Modified Tour
NASCAR
Bowman Gray, former CEO of R. J. Reynolds Tobacco Company
NASCAR K&N Pro Series East

References

External links

Official Site of Bowman Gray Stadium

NASCAR tracks
Motorsport venues in North Carolina
College football venues
Wake Forest Demon Deacons football
Winston-Salem State Rams football
Sports venues in Winston-Salem, North Carolina
1937 establishments in North Carolina
Bowman Gray family
Sports venues completed in 1937
American football venues in North Carolina